Mansour Sora Wade (born 1952, in Dakar) is a Senegalese film director of Lebou people ancestry. He studied at Paris 8 University and went on to direct the audiovisual archives for the Senegalese Ministry of Culture, a job he held from 1977 to 1985. He began making short films in 1983. In 2002 he won the Tanit d'or.

Partial filmography

1983 : Contrastes (CM)
1989 : Fary l'ânesse (CM)
1990 : Taal Pexx
1992 : Picc Mi (CM)
1993 : Aida Souka
2002 : Ndeysaan ou Le Prix du pardon (LM)
2009 : Les feux de Mansaré

References 

Senegalese film directors
People from Dakar
1952 births
Living people
Lebou people